Drinking With Jesus is a 2009 album by the Red Elvises.

Track listing 
"Drinking With Jesus"
"Lara's Wedding"
"Better Than Cocaine"
"Me & My Baby"
"Tra-la-la"
"Twist Like Uma Thurman"
"Into the Sun"
"Don't Crucify Me"
"Play Me Your Banjo"
"Wearing Black"
"Stupid Drinking Song"
"Paris Waltz"
"Bourbon Street"

Credits 

 All songs written by Igor Yuzov (except "Don't Crucify Me"  written by M. Gorsheniov and I. Yuzov)
 Produced by Red Elvises
 Igor Yuzov - vocals, guitars, bass
 Oleg Bernov - vocals, bass
 Oleg Schramm - Hammond, piano, accordion
 Elena Shemankova - keyboard, accordion, piano
 Adam Gust - drums
 Toshi Yanagi - guitar
 Nikolay Kurganov - violin
 Dean Roubicek - saxophone
 Ted Falcon - violin
 James Miller - trombone
 Artiom Zhuliev - saxophone
 Maksim Velichkin - cello
 Ron Barrows - trumpet
 M. (Gorshok) Gorsheniov - vocals on "Don't Crucify Me"
 Drums recorded at Sea Sound, engineer Evan Biegel
 Recorded at Cinque Ports, Venice CA 2008
 Recording Engineers - Oleg Schramm and Oleg Bernov
 Mixing - Barry Conley
 Mastering - Mark Chalecki, Little Red Book Mastering
 Art and Package Design - Jamie Vercauteren 
 Printing at S&J Graphics

References

External links 
 Red Elvises' official site
 Drinking With Jesus on iTunes

Red Elvises albums
2009 albums